The 2018 CAA women's soccer tournament was the postseason women's soccer tournament for the Colonial Athletic Association held from October 26 through November 3, 2018. The tournament was held at campus sites, with the higher seed hosting each game. The defending champions were the Hofstra, who successfully defended their title, beating the James Madison Dukes 2–0 in the final.
The conference tournament title was the fifth for the Hofstra women's soccer program and the fourth for head coach Simon Riddiough.

Bracket

Source:

Schedule

First round

Semifinals

Final

Statistics

Goalscorers 

2 Goals
 Sabrina Bryan – Hofstra
 Laura Ortega – Charleston
 Lucy Porter – Hofstra

1 Goal
 Raymara Barreto – Charleston
 Maddie Brill-Edwards – Charleston
 Haley Crawford – James Madison
 Stephanie Hendrie – James Madison
 Kiera Hennessy – Drexel
 Morgan Rees – Drexel

All-Tournament team

Source:

See also 
 Colonial Athletic Association
 2018 CAA Men's Soccer Tournament

References 

Colonial Athletic Association women's soccer tournament
2018 Colonial Athletic Association women's soccer season